Villa is a neighbourhood in St. John's, Antigua and Barbuda.

Demographics 
Villa has two enumeration districts.

 19000 Villa (East)
 19100 Villa (Central)

Census data

Notable people 
 Gordon Derrick, former director of the Antigua Commercial Bank
 Gaston Browne, Prime Minister of Antigua and Barbuda

References 

Saint John Parish, Antigua and Barbuda
Populated places in Antigua and Barbuda